Gary Alfred Tomlinson (born December 4, 1951) is an American musicologist and the John Hay Whitney Professor of Music and Humanities at Yale University. He was formerly the Annenberg Professor in the Humanities at the University of Pennsylvania. He graduated from the University of California, Berkeley, with a Ph.D., in 1979 with thesis titled Rinuccini, Peri, Monteverdi, and the humanist heritage of opera.

Tomlinson became Director of the Whitney Humanities Center, Yale University, in 2012.

Tomlinson's research has ranged across diverse fields, including the history of opera, early-modern European musical thought and practice, the musical cultures of indigenous American societies, and the philosophy of history and critical theory.  His latest research concerns music, culture, and human evolution.  Here he is concerned to reshape the relations of evolutionary theory, archaeology, and humanistic theory so as to offer a novel model of the emergence of human modernity.  The chief ingredients of his model are the niche-construction theory of biologists' extended evolutionary synthesis, a growing systematization of culture evident in the archaeological record, and an extended semiotics indebted to Charles Sanders Peirce.

Selected awards
1983–84 Guggenheim Fellowship
1988–93 MacArthur Fellows Program
2001 Elected to American Academy of Arts and Sciences
2010 British Academy, Derek Allen Prize
2016 Honorary membership, American Musicological Society

Books
 Culture and the Course of Human Evolution, University of Chicago Press, 2018
A Million Years of Music: The Emergence of Human Modernity, Zone Books, 2015
 The singing of the New World: indigenous voice in the era of European contact, Cambridge University Press, 2007, 
Music and Historical Critique: Selected Essays, Ashgate, 2007
 Metaphysical song: an essay on opera, Princeton University Press, 1999,  
Music in renaissance magic: toward a historiography of others, University of Chicago Press, 1993
 Monteverdi and the end of the Renaissance, University of California Press, 1987
 (with Joseph Kerman) Listen, sixth edn., Bedford/St.Martin's, 2008
Ed., Italian Secular Song, 1606–1636, 7 vols., Garland, 1987–88
Ed., Strunk's Source readings in Music History, revised edition, The Renaissance, Norton, 1998

Selected essays
 "Two Deep-Historical Models of Climate Crisis," South Atlantic Quarterly 116 (2017)
 "Sound, Affect, and Musicking before the Human," boundary 2 43 (2016)
 "Evolutionary Studies in the Humanities: The Case of Music," Critical Inquiry 39 (2013)
 "Parahuman Wagnerism," The Opera Quarterly 29 (2013)
 "Il faut mediterraniser la musique: After Braudel," in Braudel Revisited: The Mediterranean World, 1600–1800 (University of Toronto Press, 2010)
 "Hamlet and Poppea: Musicking Benjamin's Trauerspiel," in The Opera Quarterly 25 (2009)
 "Monumental Musicology," review essay of Richard Taruskin, The Oxford History of Western Music, in Journal of the Royal Musical Association 132 (2007)
 "Musicology, Anthropology, History," in The Cultural Study of Music (Rutledge, 2003, 2011)
 "Vico's Songs: Detours at the Origins of Ethnomusicology," in The Musical Quarterly 83 (1999)
 "Ideologies of Aztec Song," in Journal of the American Musicological Society 48 (1995)
 "Musical Pasts and Postmodern Musicologies: A Response to Lawrence Kramer," in Current Musicology 53 (1993)
"Cultural Dialogics and Jazz: A White Historian Signifies," in Black Music Research Journal 11 (1991)
 "Italian Romanticism and Italian Opera: An Essay in Their Affinities," in 19th-Century Music 9 (1986)
 "The Web of Culture: A Context for Musicology," in 19th-Century Music 7 (1984)
 "Madrigal, Monody, and Monteverdi's via naturale alla immitatione," Journal of the American Musicological Society 34 (1981)

References

External links
"Where it all began", Penn Current, Jan. 10, 2008.

American musicologists
Living people
University of California, Berkeley alumni
University of Pennsylvania faculty
MacArthur Fellows
1951 births